Chris Marie Keyser is the Executive Director of the Fairview Community Health Center, a Federally Qualified Health Center providing [primary care] services to the poor of South-Central Kentucky. She has been a leading figure in the National Association of Community Health Centers and a frequent public voice for the role of primary care in health care reform.

She was awarded the degree of Bachelor of Science in biology by Western Kentucky University in 1981 and a Bachelor of Science in medical technology by the Owensboro-Daviess County Hospital in 1982. She was employed as a medical technologist at Stanford University Children's Hospital from 1990–1991 and as lab supervisor at Capelli-Shepler Family Medical Center in Kenosha, Wisconsin from 1991-1992.

In 1993 she returned to Kentucky and joined the staff of the Barren River District Health Department as medical technology lab supervisor and primary care center coordinator. The primary care services of the Barren River District Health Department became an independent non-profit corporation in 1999 as the Bowling Green/Warren County Primary Care Center, Inc. (BG/WCPCC) and she became its executive director. Under the name Fairview Community Health Center, BG/WCPCC now operates three clinical facilities in Bowling Green.

References

External links
Fairview Community Health Center
National Association of Community Health Centers
National Association for Public Health Policy

Living people
Western Kentucky University alumni
Year of birth missing (living people)